The 1973–74 Spartan League season was the 56th in the history of Spartan League. The league consisted of 18 teams.

League table

The division featured 18 teams, 16 from last season and 2 new teams:
 Camberley Town, from Surrey Senior League
 Rayners Lane

References

Spartan League seasons
1973–74 in English football leagues